Mikael Ymer (born 9 September 1998) is a Swedish tennis player. He has a career high ATP singles ranking of world No. 57, achieved on 6 March 2023. In the ATP doubles ranking his career high is No. 187, achieved in October 2017. He is currently the No. 1 Swedish player.

Early life
Ymer was born in Skara, Sweden to Ethiopian immigrant parents. His mother, Kelem, is a physician; his father, Wondwosen, works at a dairy company. He is the younger brother of fellow tennis player Elias Ymer. His other younger brother, Rafael, is a tennis player on the juniors' circuit.

Juniors
Mikael contested his first junior major final at the 2015 Wimbledon Championships but was defeated by American Reilly Opelka in straight sets.

In 2015 Ymer managed to claim his second European Championships title (U18), beating Bernabé Zapata Miralles in the final in straight sets.

Professional career

2016-2018: Maiden ATP title in doubles, Masters 1000 debut and first win
He made his Masters 1000 debut at the 2017 Miami Open as a wildcard and won his first match at this level in the 2018 edition of the same tournament after also receiving a wildcard.

2019-2021: Major & Top 70 debut, Two Majors third rounds, Maiden final in singles 
He made his Grand Slam main draw debut through qualifying at the 2019 French Open where he recorded his first Major win against fellow qualifier Blaž Rola in straight sets.

He finished year 2019 ranked No. 74 in the singles rankings.

Ymer reached the third round of a Grand Slam tournament for the first time in his career at the 2021 Australian Open. He did so by defeating twenty-sixth seed Hubert Hurkacz and qualifier Carlos Alcaraz, before losing to fifth seed Stefanos Tsitsipas.

As world No. 105 at the 2021 French Open, Ymer achieved the biggest win of his career by defeating world number 15 Gaël Monfils in the second round. With this victory, he once again reached the third round of a major, this time losing to Jannik Sinner.

At the 2021 Winston-Salem Open, Ymer beat eleventh seed Albert Ramos-Vinolas, lucky loser Max Purcell, and thirteenth seed Frances Tiafoe to reach his first ATP semifinal. He continued with a win over fifteenth seed Carlos Alcaraz to reach his first ATP final, making him the first Swedish tour-level finalist since Robin Söderling at the 2011 Swedish Open. Ymer lost the final to Ilya Ivashka in straight sets in 56 minutes.

In August, Ymer played at the 2021 US Open, losing to Jenson Brooksby in the first round.

He finished year 2021 ranked No. 93 in the singles rankings.

2022: French Open third round, Maiden ATP 500 semifinal 
Ymer was not able to defend his third round showing at the 2022 Australian Open, losing to Stefanos Tsitsipas in the opening round.

In February, at the 2022 Open Sud de France, Ymer reached the semifinals, defeating three French players Corentin Moutet, third seed Gael Monfils (his second top-20 win) and Richard Gasquet.

At the 2022 French Open he reached the third round at this Major for the second consecutive time in his career defeating James Duckworth and 29th seed Dan Evans before losing to 4th seed Stefanos Tsitsipas.

At 2022 Wimbledon Championships he reached the second round defeating Daniel Altmaier.

At the 2022 Citi Open he defeated Andy Murray and 15th seed Aslan Karatsev to reach the round of 16. Next he defeated Emil Ruusuvuori to reach the quarterfinals of an ATP 500 tournament for the first time. In the quarterfinals, he defeated Sebastian Korda in three sets to advance to his first ATP 500 semifinal in his career. As a result he moved close to 40 positions up the rankings back into the top 80 to No. 77 on 8 August 2022.

At the 2022 Winston-Salem Open, Ymer received a wildcard but lost in the second to qualifier Marc-Andrea Huesler. As a result his ranking fell to No. 99 on 29 August 2022. At the US Open he lost in the first round.

At the 2022 Firenze Open he reached the semifinals as a qualifier defeating again fifth seed Aslan Karatsev and Roberto Carballes Baena but lost to JJ Wolf. As a result he moved 20 positions up in the rankings back into the top 80 on 17 October 2022.
At his home tournament in Stockholm using a special exempt status, he reached the quarterfinals where he lost to top seed Stefanos Tsitsipas. As a result he moved up to No. 76 on 24 October 2022.
He continued his good form qualifiying for the main draw of the 2022 Rolex Paris Masters for the second year in a row. He won his first round match defeating Alexander Bublik. He lost to world No. 8 Felix Auger-Aliassime  in a three tight set match with two tiebreaks that lasted 3 hours and 30 minutes.

2023: Top 60 debut
At the 2023 Adelaide International 2 he reached the quarterfinals after qualifying defeating Emil Ruusuvuori and Mackenzie McDonald en route.
He lost in the first round at the 2023 Australian Open to Yoshihito Nishioka. He reached the top 60 on 30 January 2023.

At the 2023 Open Sud de France he lost to Ruusuvuori.
At the Rotterdam Open he qualified again for the main draw but lost to wildcard Tallon Griekspoor. At the 2023 Open 13 Provence he reached the quarterfinals after a walkover from sixth seed David Goffin in the second round. He lost to top seed and eventual champion Hubert Hurkacz.

Performance timelines

Singles 
Current through the 2022 Open 13.

Doubles

ATP career finals

Singles: 1 (1 runner-up)

Doubles: 1 (1 title)

ATP Challenger and ITF Futures finals

Singles: 10 (6–4)

Doubles: 1 (0–1)

Junior Grand Slam finals

Boys' Singles: 1 (1 runner–up)

Record against top 10 players
Ymer's record against those who have been ranked in the top 10, with active players in boldface.

Notes

References

External links

 
 
 

1998 births
Living people
Swedish male tennis players
Tennis players from Stockholm
People from Skara Municipality
Swedish people of Ethiopian descent
Swedish sportspeople of African descent
Sportspeople of Ethiopian descent
21st-century Swedish people